Rock Around the Blockade (RATB), is a Cuba solidarity organisation in Britain founded by members of the Revolutionary Communist Group (UK) in 1995. RATB sees the struggle to defend the Cuban Revolution as part of building a movement for socialism and communism in Britain. In this it appears to differ from the Cuba Solidarity Campaign which attempts to build a broad front, largely but not exclusively through the mainstream labour movement, in support of the Cuban Revolution through emphasising the defence of Cuba's right to sovereignty.

RATB campaigns on issues such as the US economic blockade and the Cuban Five and also sends political solidarity brigades to Cuba. RATB raised funds to provide material aid to Cuba, through the campaign's links with the Union of Young Communists (UJC) in Cuba. The group has donated five sound systems, to be used for propaganda and cultural purposes, over a ten-year period.  Membership according to the group’s website is open to all who support the Cuban revolution. Members and supporters are active in Dundee, Glasgow, Edinburgh, Coatbridge, Newcastle, Middlesbrough, Durham, Leeds, Manchester, Liverpool, Nottingham, Leicester, across Greater London and Brighton.

Campaigning against the US blockade 
RATB campaigns against the United States blockade against Cuba. The campaign has organised demonstrations, pickets and other protests to highlight these issues across many towns and cities in Britain.  RATB also offers political solidarity in support of the Cuban Communist revolution. The group has a working relationship with the main Cuban daily youth newspaper Juventud Rebelde (Rebellious Youth), the newspaper of the Union of Young Communists (Unión de Jóvenes Comunistas). RATB has its own bimonthly newsletter called Viva Cuba!

Cuban Five 
RATB have campaigned for the release of five Cubans known by campaigners as the Cuban Five. The Cuban Five are Gerardo Hernández, Antonio Guerrero, Ramón Labañino, Fernando Gonzáles, and René Gonzáles, five Cuban nationals who were arrested and convicted on charges of espionage, conspiracy to commit murder, and other crimes in the United States. All five are currently serving prison terms in the United States. RATB's activities have included street protests in many towns and cities in Britain along with protests outside the US embassy in London and the US consulate in Edinburgh. 
In May 2007 activists from RATB attended the first international youth conference to free the Cuban Five in Havana, Cuba and were invited to have a speaker on the platform.

Boycott Bacardi Campaign 
Following in the footsteps of other solidarity groups around the world, in August 1999, RATB launched their own Boycott Bacardi Campaign by closing down the corporation's British headquarters for a day. Bacardi backs the US blockade of Cuba and funds the Miami exile community .

In his book, Bacardi, The Hidden War, Hernando Calvo Ospina details the political aspect of the Bacardi corporation. The Boycott Bacardi Campaign is being picked up and duplicated throughout the world.

Cuban Speaking tour 
In spring 2002 RATB hosted a national speaking tour of Britain with two Cuban women youth leaders. Meetings were held in schools, colleges, universities and housing estates from Brighton to Dundee. The Cubans spoke to thousands of people across Britain about the revolution in Cuba, developments in Latin America and the global struggle against neoliberalism and imperialism.

Between 21 February and 8 March 2008 Rock around the Blockade are hosting a speaking tour of Britain with representatives of three generations of the Cuban Revolution: Orlando Borrego, deputy to Ernesto ‘Che’ Guevara and his closest collaborator from 1959 to 1965; Jesus García, from the Institute of Philosophy, delegate to the Municipal Assembly of Peoples’ Power and author of several books on socialism and democracy; and Yoselin Rufin – a leader in the Federation of University Students (FEU), involved in today’s energy revolution, a new stage in Cuba’s Battle of Ideas.

External links 
 Rock Around the Blockade Online
 CUBA: Defending Socialism, Resisting Imperialism (documentary) - Documentary film produced by RATB about modern day Cuba and its revolution
 Cuban Speaking Tour Website
 1959 – 2009 Celebrating 50 years of the Cuban Revolution

Political organisations based in the United Kingdom
Cuba solidarity groups
Organizations established in 1995
Cuba–United Kingdom relations